Jeonju World Cup Stadium is a football stadium in the South Korean city of Jeonju. It is the home of Jeonbuk Hyundai Motors. The stadium's capacity is 42,477. The final of 2011 AFC Champions League was held at this stadium.

History
The Jeonju World Cup Stadium was constructed for the 2002 FIFA World Cup which was co-hosted by South Korea and Japan. The construction of the stadium started on February 19, 1999, and was officially opened two years later, on November 8, 2001, by South Korean President Kim Dae-jung.

2002 FIFA World Cup
Jeonju World Cup Stadium hosted three matches of the 2002 FIFA World Cup, hosting two group stage matches and one Round-of-16 match.

Photos

References
전북 현대와 전주의 미래와 함께하는 전주 월드컵 경기장  - Dream stadium of K-League

External links

 Jeonju Sports Facilities Management Center  
 Jeonbuk Hyundai Motors Official Site 
 Jeonbuk Hyundai Motors Official Site 
 World Stadiums

Buildings and structures in Jeonju
Jeonbuk Hyundai Motors
2002 FIFA World Cup stadiums in South Korea
Football venues in South Korea
Sports venues in North Jeolla Province
Sport in Jeonju
Sports venues completed in 2001
K League 1 stadiums
2001 establishments in South Korea